Kalambo District is one of the four districts of the Rukwa Region of Tanzania, East Africa.  The administrative seat is in Matai.  The Kalambo River flows through the district and its mouth on Lake Tanganyika is about 15 km south of the town of Kasanga.

Kalambo District Council was officially established on 23 December 2012 after it was split off from the Sumbawanga District Council. Moshi Chang'a was the first District Commissioner, who served until his death in an auto accident in April 2014.

Economy
Most people are employed in herding and subsistence farming. The major cash crops are maize, sunflowers, beans, cassava and honey. Some people are employed in artisanal mining and traditional fishing. There are copper deposits at Kasanga and Kapapa.

Administrative subdivisions

Constituencies
For parliamentary elections, Tanzania is divided into constituencies. As of the 2010 elections the area that is now Kalambo District had one constituency:
 Kalambo Constituency

Divisions
Kalambo District is administratively divided into  5 divisions.
1. Matai
2. Mwazye
3. Mwimbi
4. Kasanga
5. Mambwe Nkoswe

Wards
Kalambo District is administratively divided into 23 wards:
1.  Kasanga
2.  Katazi
3.  Katete
4.  Kisumba
5.  Legeza Mwendo
6. Mambwe Kenya
7.  Mambwe Nkoswe
8.  Matai
9.  Mkali
10  Mkowe
11. Msanzi
12. Mwazye
13.  Mwimbi
14.  Sopa
15. Ulumi
16. Sundu
17. Mbuluma
18. Lyowa
19. Samazi
20. Kilesha 
21. Mnamba
22. Kanyezi
23. Mpombwe

Notes

Districts of Rukwa Region
States and territories established in 2012